Sebastián Rusculleda (born 28 April 1985 in Laboulaye, Córdoba) is an Argentine footballer who currently plays for PS Kemi in Finland.

Club career
Rusculleda started his football career in the Boca Juniors youth team, he spent some time at Ajax in the Netherlands before returning to Boca. In 2006, he joined Quilmes but after a disastrous 2006-2007 season the club was relegated from the Argentine Primera.

Rusculleda then joined Tigre where he established himself as an important member of the team that finished 2nd in the Apertura 2007, Tigre's highest ever league position. He signed for Al-Ahli in July 2009. On 2 January 2010 CA San Lorenzo have signed the left winger from Al-Ahli Jeddah.

On 12 January 2015, Rusculleda signed a 1.5-year contract with Greek club Panetolikos F.C.

External links
Sebastián Rusculleda – Argentine Primera statistics at Fútbol XXI  
 
 Football-Lineups player profile
 

1985 births
Living people
Sportspeople from Córdoba Province, Argentina
Argentine footballers
Association football wingers
Quilmes Atlético Club footballers
Club Atlético Tigre footballers
San Lorenzo de Almagro footballers
Santiago Wanderers footballers
S.D. Quito footballers
Panetolikos F.C. players
Al-Ahli Saudi FC players
San Martín de San Juan footballers
Kemi City F.C. players
Chilean Primera División players
Argentine Primera División players
Ecuadorian Serie A players
Saudi Professional League players
Super League Greece players
Veikkausliiga players
Expatriate footballers in Chile
Expatriate footballers in Ecuador
Expatriate footballers in Saudi Arabia
Argentine expatriate sportspeople in Saudi Arabia